Chamkar Leu ( "Upper Farm") is a district (srok) of Kampong Cham province, Cambodia. The district capital is Chamkar Leu town. The district is significant producer of rubber, both for domestic consumption and for export. Two large rubber co-operatives, Chamkar Andong Plantation and Chamkar Leu Plantation are located in the district. At , the state-owned Chamkar Andong plantation is one of the largest in the country.

Location 
Reading from the north clockwise, Chamkar Leu shares a border with Kampong Thom province to the north and the district of Stueng Trang to the east. To the south of Chamkar Leu are Kampong Siem (south east) and Prey Chhor (south west) districts. Chamkar Leu shares its western border with Baray district of Kampong Thom province.

Administration 
Klouth Chenda is the district governor and reports to Kouch Chamroeun the Governor of Kampong Cham. The following table shows the villages of Chamkar Leu district by commune.

Demographics 
The district is subdivided into 8 communes (khum) and 85 villages (phum). According to the 1998 Census, the population of the district was 125,862 persons in 24,338 households in 1998. With a population of well over 100,000 people, Chamkar Leu is the third most populous district in Kampong Cham province, after Tbong Khmum and Prey Chhor. The average household size in Chamkar Leu is 5.2 persons per household, slightly larger than the rural average for Cambodia (5.1 persons). The sex ratio in the district is 95.5%, with more females than males.

Recent history 
Located in eastern Cambodia, not far from the border with Vietnam, Chamkar Leu was the site of significant fighting during the Cambodian Civil War. During the Second Indochina War the district was heavily bombed by both B-52 and smaller aircraft. One of the senior leaders of the Khmer Rouge, Ke Pauk was born in nearby Baray district. According to his auto-biography, Pauk joined the nascent Cambodian Communist movement in Svay Teab, Chamkar Leu District, Kampong Cham.

References

External links
update 11/09/2019 by yim marin
Kampong Cham at Royal government of Cambodia website
Kampong Cham at Ministry of Commerce website

Districts of Kampong Cham province